Akali Santa Singh  (1928–2008) was a Nihang and 13th Jathedar of Budha Dal, after Akali Chet Singh. He was born as Pashaura Singh in Gujranwala.

Bhang consumption issue
In 2001, Baba Santa Singh, the Jathedar of Budha Dal, along with 20 chiefs of Nihang sects, refused to accept the ban on consumption of bhang by the apex Sikh clergy.

Operation Bluestar
Baba Santa Singh rebuilt the Akal Takht after Operation Blue Star. It was torn down two years later under the orders of Baba Thakur Singh Ji, the leader of the Damdami Taksal, at the 1986 Sarbat Khalsa.

References

Nihang
Cannabis activists
Cannabis and Sikhism
1928 births
2008 deaths